Grandstar Cargo International Airlines Company was a cargo airline based in Tianjin, China. It was a joint venture between Sinotrans Air transportation Development Company and Korean Air Cargo. It planned to operate scheduled and non-scheduled international cargo flights to Europe, America, and Asia.

The airline was founded in 2008 and ended operations in May 2012.

Grandstar Cargo had served Frankfurt, Shanghai and Seoul from Tianjin.

They operated a single Boeing 747-400F/SCD.

References

External links 
Official website

Airlines established in 2008
Airlines disestablished in 2012
Defunct airlines of China
Chinese companies established in 2008
Chinese companies disestablished in 2012